Michael Fogarty may refer to:
 Michael Fogarty (bishop), Irish former Roman Catholic prelate and Bishop of Killaloe
 Michael Fogarty (politician), British former Liberal Party politician and academic